Davyd Bichinashvili (born February 3, 1975, in Tbilisi, Georgian SSR, Soviet Union) is an amateur Georgian-born German freestyle wrestler, who played for the men's light heavyweight category. He is a three-time Olympian, and a four-time medalist for his division at the European Wrestling Championships (1997, 1998, 2001, and 2008).

Wrestling career
Since he left Georgia in 1994, Bichinashvili had won a total of three medals (two silver and one bronze) for the men's light heavyweight division at the European Wrestling Championships (1997 in Warsaw, Poland, 1998 in Bratislava, Slovakia, and 2001 in Budapest, Hungary), representing his first adopted nation Ukraine. Bichinashvili made his official debut for the 2000 Summer Olympics in Sydney, where he placed second in the three-person preliminary pool of the men's 85 kg class, against Macedonia's Mogamed Ibragimov, and Japan's Tatsuo Kawai.

Shortly after the Olympics, Bichinashvili moved to his another adopted nation Germany, where he applied and obtained a dual citizenship in order to compete internationally for wrestling. At the 2004 Summer Olympics in Athens, Bichinashvili competed for the men's 84 kg class, as a member of the German wrestling team, after winning his division from the Olympic Qualification Tournament in Sofia, Bulgaria. He had exactly finished the same position as his previous Olympics in the preliminary pool round, against Cuba's Yoel Romero and Guam's Jeffrey Cobb, attaining a total score of 10 technical and 4 classification points.

Eight years after competing in his first Olympics, Bichinashvili qualified for his third time in men's 84 kg class, as a 33-year-old, at the 2008 Summer Olympics in Beijing, by placing seventh from the 2007 World Wrestling Championships in Baku, Azerbaijan. He received a bye for the preliminary round of sixteen match, before losing out to Georgia's Revaz Mindorashvili, with a three-set technical score (1–4, 2–0, 3–1), and a classification score of 1–3. Because his opponent advanced further into the final match, Bichinashvili took advantage of the repechage rounds by defeating Armenia's Harutyun Yenokyan, after the pair had scored 4–3. He progressed to the bronze medal match, but narrowly lost the medal to Russia's Georgy Ketoev, with a three-set technical score (0–3, 2–0, 2–2), and a classification point score of 1–3.

References

External links
Profile – International Wrestling Database
NBC Olympics Profile
 

Ukrainian male sport wrestlers
1975 births
Living people
Olympic wrestlers of Ukraine
Olympic wrestlers of Germany
Wrestlers at the 2000 Summer Olympics
German male sport wrestlers
Wrestlers at the 2004 Summer Olympics
Wrestlers at the 2008 Summer Olympics
Sportspeople from Tbilisi
Sportspeople from Freiburg im Breisgau
Georgian emigrants to Germany
German people of Georgian descent
Ukrainian people of Georgian descent